Jacob Fillmore Burket (March 25, 1837 – October 9, 1906) was a Republican politician in the U.S. State of Ohio who was an Ohio Supreme Court Judge 1893–1904.

Biography
Jacob F. Burket was born in Perry County, Ohio on a farm near Somerset. In 1839, his family moved to Hancock County, where he worked on a farm and attended country schools. At age seventeen, he was apprenticed to his brother-in-law in Findlay to learn the carpenter's trade. In 1855, he began teaching school, and in 1859, graduated from an academy in Republic in Seneca County.

Burket was admitted to the bar July 1, 1861, and commenced practice at Ottawa, Ohio. He moved to Findlay in 1862, and practiced there until elected to the Supreme Court.

In 1892, the Ohio Legislature increased the membership of the Supreme Court from five members to six. Burket was nominated by the Republicans to the new seat, and defeated Democrat Thomas Beer by fewer than 2000 votes of 800,000 cast. He served a five-year term and was re-elected in 1897, this time to a six-year term. He served until February 1904.

Judge Burket was married to Pamy D. Walters of Adrian, Michigan in 1859. They had six children. From 1873 to 1887, Burket was attorney and director of the First National Bank of Findlay. Burket was a Lutheran and member of the Odd Fellows, serving as Ohio Grand Master in 1883. He was a Presidential elector for Garfield/Arthur in 1880. He died October 9, 1906 in Findlay from Bright's disease, and is buried in Maple Grove Cemetery in Findlay.

See also
List of justices of the Ohio Supreme Court

Notes

References

Ohio lawyers
Justices of the Ohio Supreme Court
Ohio Republicans
1880 United States presidential electors
People from Hancock County, Ohio
People from Somerset, Ohio
1837 births
1906 deaths
People from Findlay, Ohio
Deaths from nephritis
19th-century American judges